Adesoye Oyetundzhiyevich Oyevole (born 18 September 1982) is a Russian football official and a former defender of Nigerian heritage. He played as a central defender. He works as a chief analyst with FC Orenburg.

Career
Born in Moscow to a Nigerian father and a Russian Tatar mother, Oyevole moved to Bida, Nigeria at early age, and moved back to Russia at 5.

International
He has played in Russian youth national teams.

External links
Profile

1982 births
Footballers from Moscow
Yoruba sportspeople
Russian people of Yoruba descent
Russian people of Nigerian descent
Living people
Russian footballers
Association football defenders
FC Zhemchuzhina Sochi players
FC Ural Yekaterinburg players
FC Sibir Novosibirsk players
Russian Premier League players
FC Orenburg players
FC Tambov players